Munayshy Stadium is a multi-use stadium in Atyrau, Kazakhstan.  It is currently used mostly for football matches and is the home stadium of FC Atyrau.

History
The stadium was opened on 1 May 1950. Its capacity is 8690 spectators. The pitch measures 105 by 70 metres. In 1999, "Munashy" stadium was completely overhauled and as a new modern sport complex rebuilt. In 2008, a modern swimming pool was put into operation in the "Munaishy" complex.

Features
 Three stands - West, North and East
 Capacity - 8 690 spectators
 Field size - 105 x 70 metres
 Artificial turf (2019)
 Seats - Plastic
 VIP seats 
 Electronic scoreboard

References

Football venues in Kazakhstan
Buildings and structures in Atyrau

ru:Мунайшы